The little yellow-shouldered bat (Sturnira lilium) is a bat species from South and Central America. It is a frugivore and an effective seed disperser. 

It roosts alone in tree cavities, on branches, vines, and under palm leaves, usually keeping to the same roosts day to day. There is evidence to suggest hypothermia is a  thermoregulatory strategy to help adjust metabolic levels. Ambient temperature has been noted as a greater influence on mating than food availability. Its wing shape can also be affected by pregnancy in order to make flight more efficient.

Gallery

References

Bats of South America
Bats of Brazil
Mammals of Chile
Mammals of Colombia
Mammals described in 1810
Bats of Central America
Sturnira
Taxa named by Étienne Geoffroy Saint-Hilaire